Chrysobothris peninsularis is a species of metallic wood-boring beetle in the family Buprestidae. It is found in Central America and North America.

Subspecies
These two subspecies belong to the species Chrysobothris peninsularis:
 Chrysobothris peninsularis peninsularis Schaeffer, 1904
 Chrysobothris peninsularis sinaloae Van Dyke, 1951

References

Further reading

 
 
 

Buprestidae
Articles created by Qbugbot
Beetles described in 1904